Heliot may refer to:

 Claire Heliot, German woman lion tamer born Klara Haumann (Huth) (1866–1953)
 Johan Heliot, pen name of French science fiction writer Stéphane Boillot-Cousin (born 1970)
 Heliot Ramos (born 1999), Puerto Rican professional baseball player